Wolf Koenig (October 17, 1927 – June 26, 2014) was a Canadian film director, producer, animator, cinematographer, and a pioneer in Direct Cinema at the National Film Board of Canada.

Early life
Born in Dresden, Germany, Koenig emigrated to Canada with his family in 1937, when they fled Nazi Germany. They settled in  farm along the Grand River, outside what is now known as Cambridge, Ontario. In 1948, a local representative for the Canadian department of agriculture needed the family's tractor to demonstrate a new tree-planting machine. As the young Koenig pulled the machine across a field, he noticed a small film crew from the NFB's former agricultural film unit, recording the demonstration. After filming was complete, he approached the men, who included director Raymond Garceau, and told them he loved films, especially animation, and hoped to work in filmmaking. They suggested he send in a job application and approximately six weeks later he received a letter offering him the position of a junior splicer for $100 per month.

NFB career
Koenig quickly established himself as a multi-talented artist, filming Norman McLaren's Neighbours (1952), animating Colin Low's The Romance of Transportation in Canada (1953) and serving as cinematographer on Low's Corral (1954). Koenig co-directed several historically significant NFB documentaries during, including City of Gold (with Low, 1957), The Days Before Christmas (1958), Lonely Boy (with Kroitor, 1962) and Stravinsky (1965). Along with Terence Macartney-Filgate, Roman Kroitor and Tom Daly, he was also one of the principal contributors to the NFB's Candid Eye series, which was influential in the development of direct cinema.

Koenig made major contributions to a range of notable projects. He was also the cinematographer for Arthur Lipsett's Experimental Film (1963) and N-Zone (1970), both admired by George Lucas.

Koenig served as executive producer of the NFB's English animation unit from 1962 to 1967 and again from 1972 to 1975. His credits as an animation producer included the Academy Award nominees The Drag (1966), What on Earth! (1966) and The House That Jack Built (1967). Koenig also produced Alanis Obomsawin's documentary Kanehsatake: 270 Years of Resistance, named Best Canadian Feature Film at the 1993 Festival of Festivals (now Toronto International Film Festival).

Legacy
Koenig retired from the NFB in 1995 to Westport, Ontario, where he made furniture and remained sporadically active in film.

He received numerous honours awards during his career, including a 1984 Genie Award for Best Theatrical Short as producer of Ted Baryluk's Grocery and six Canadian Film Awards: Film of the Year and Best Arts and Experimental Film for City of Gold, Film of the Year and Best General Information Film for Lonely Boy, Best TV Information Film for Stravinsky and Best Documentary Short Film for The Hottest Show on Earth (1977).

Koenig died June 26, 2014 in Toronto at the age of 86.

References

External links

Wolf Koenig, Canadian Film Encyclopedia, Film Reference Library, Toronto International Film Festival
Watch films by Wolf Koenig at NFB.ca

1927 births
2014 deaths
Canadian documentary film directors
Canadian cinematographers
Canadian animated film producers
Film producers from Ontario
Canadian animators
Jewish emigrants from Nazi Germany to Canada
Canadian documentary film producers
National Film Board of Canada people
People from Leeds and Grenville United Counties
People from Cambridge, Ontario
Canadian Screen Award winners
Canadian cinema pioneers
Film people from Dresden